The Alexander Hamilton statue is a monumental statue of Alexander Hamilton in Chicago, Illinois, United States. Located in the city's Lincoln Park, the monument was installed in 1952, having been completed several years prior in 1939.

History 
The monument honoring Alexander Hamilton was proposed by philanthropist Kate Sturges Buckingham before her death in 1937. Her will included a $1 million earmark to the Art Institute of Chicago for monument's construction. Buckingham felt that Hamilton was an underappreciated figure in the creation of the United States, and before her death, she commissioned sculptor John Angel to design a statue of Hamilton and architect Eliel Saarinen to create an  column that the statue would rest on. The statue was completed in 1939, while the column idea was never executed. Following this, the statue would remain in storage for over 12 years due to bronze shortages during World War II. The monument was dedicated in Lincoln Park in 1952, accompanied by a large plinth behind it made of limestone and granite designed by Samuel A. Marx. However, this plinth was later removed in October 1993, and shortly thereafter the monument was placed on a new, red granite pedestal. In 2016, the statue underwent a $52,000 renovation that included an extensive re-gilding.

Design 

See also 

 1939 in art

References

External links 
 
 

1939 sculptures
1952 establishments in Illinois
Bronze sculptures in Illinois
Statues of Alexander Hamilton
Monuments and memorials in Chicago
Outdoor sculptures in Chicago
Sculptures of men in Illinois
Statues in Chicago